Graham Donald Harry Preskett is a British composer and musician who has been active since the early 1970s. He appeared on the Mott the Hoople albums Mott (1973) and The Hoople (1974), playing violin on both, and arranging and conducting on the latter.

In his autobiography Snakes and Ladders (2016), Whitesnake guitarist Micky Moody wrote of their 1978 album Snakebite:

Selected works 
Preskett is credited on the following releases:

 Mott – Mott the Hoople (1973), violin
 The Hoople – Mott the Hoople (1974), arranger, conductor, violin, tubular bells, orchestration
 Streets – Ralph McTell (1975), arranger, string arrangements
 Afternoon Sunshine – Edwin Starr (1977), fiddle
 City to City – Gerry Rafferty (1978), vocals, mandolin, violin, fiddle, keyboards, string arrangements, brass arrangements, string machine
 "Baker Street" – Gerry Rafferty (1978), string arrangements
 Snakebite – Whitesnake (1978), violin
 Something to Talk About score (1995; with Hans Zimmer), primary artist, composer
 Musical Tour of Scotland (1995), arranger, piano, violin, producer
 The Da Vinci Code soundtrack (2006; with Hans Zimmer), arranger, composer

References 

20th-century British composers
20th-century British musicians
21st-century British composers
21st-century British musicians
Music arrangers
British male violinists
British fiddlers
British male pianists